Braddell Bus Park is a SBS Transit bus park on Braddell Road in Toa Payoh, Singapore. It also serves as a bus park for ComfortDelGro buses. As of November 2014, the total fleet is 286 buses.

Braddell Bus Park was built in 1978 replacing the former bus park at MacKenzie Road of which it is owned by the Singapore Traction Company. Braddell Bus Park acts as a central bus depot called Toa Payoh Bus Depot (TPDEP), before it went for renovation in 1997 to build a new building called ComfortDelGro, before renaming to Braddell Bus Park in 2001.

Besides serving as a bus park, the premises also serves as the headquarters for ComfortDelGro and many of its local subsidiaries, which are mainly located in two blocks of office buildings. These subsidiaries are SBS Transit, ComfortDelGro Bus, CityCab, ComfortDelGro Engineering, ComfortDelGro Rent-A-Car, Metroline and Moove Media. There are also workshops run by ComfortDelGro Engineering in the premises.

References

External links
 

Toa Payoh
Bus stations in Singapore